The Tallahassee Wine and Food Festival is an annual two-day charitable event held in November in Tallahassee, Florida, United States which began in 1995.

Non-profit affiliations 
The TWFF benefits the March of Dimes to improve the health of babies by preventing birth defects, preterm birth, and infant mortality.

Events within the larger event 
The TWFF as a whole is a combination of several smaller events which include: A wine dinner reception, wine dinner, celebrity chef, VIP reception at wine tasting, festival shoppe, wine auction, 
silent auction, press and media party, golf tournament, and meélange market.

Sponsors 
The TWFF is sponsored at-large by insurance companies in the categories of diamond, platinum, gold, silver and bronze. Each of the festival's separate events shown above are sponsored by local businesses.

Media sponsors include some of Tallahassee's print media such as the Tallahassee Democrat, Tallahassee Magazine as well as broadcast media such as Comcast and Clear Channel Communications.

See also
Boston wine festival
Food Network South Beach Wine and Food Festival
San Diego Bay Wine & Food Festival
Naples Grape Festival

References

External links 

Culture of Tallahassee, Florida
Festivals in Florida
Food and drink festivals in the United States
Tourist attractions in Tallahassee, Florida
Wine festivals in the United States
1995 establishments in Florida
Festivals established in 1995